Singin' to God is an a cappella tribute to Cardiacs' 1996 fourth studio album, Sing to God, by the American vocal group the 180 Gs. Released on 3 July 2018, it received positive critical reception for its effort and faithfullness to the source material. The album was mixed by ex-Cardiacs member Mark Cawthra and was the group's second album following 2007's 180 D'Gs to the Future!, a tribute to the experimental band Negativland.

Critical reception 
In the magazine Art Rockin, Lee Henderson praised the album for being "full of abundant lushness, ripe with energy, tenacious arrangements, with nearly unreal accomplishment." Matt Keeley of Kittysneezes said that the album was "mostly for those who are already fans of Cardiacs" and called the a cappella arrangements of the band's complex melodies "jawdropping", with the album being "a masterpiece in its own right" alongside the original.

 Track listing 
All songs written by Tim Smith unless otherwise indicated.

 Personnel The 180 Gs Chris Minnick – vocals and body percussion
 David Minnick – vocals, vocal arrangements and body percussion
 Dick Minnick – vocals and body percussion
 Don Minnick – vocals and body percussion
 Mark Minnick – vocals and body percussion
 Peter Minnick – vocals and body percussionAdditional musicians and production'

 Rosey Minnick – child vocals on "Fairy Mary Mag"
 David Minnick – producer
 Mark Cawthra – mastering
 Josh Silverstein – cover art

Notes

References

External links 

 
 

2018 albums
Cardiacs tribute albums